John Lewis & Partners (formerly and commonly known as John Lewis) is a brand of high-end department stores operating throughout the United Kingdom, with concessions also located in Ireland. The brand sells general merchandise as part of the employee-owned mutual organisation known as the John Lewis Partnership, the largest co-operative in the United Kingdom. It was created by Spedan Lewis, son of the founder, John Lewis, in 1929. From 1925 to 2022, the chain had a policy that it would always at least match a lower price offered by a national high street competitor; this pledge was known by the name "Never Knowingly Undersold".

The first John Lewis store was opened in 1864 in Oxford Street, London, and there are now 35 stores throughout Great Britain. The first John Lewis concession in Ireland opened in a Dublin Arnotts store in October 2016. In the same year, the first Australian John Lewis concession also opened.

On 1 January 2008, the Oxford Street store was awarded a Royal Warrant from Queen Elizabeth II as "suppliers of haberdashery and household goods". John Lewis & Partners Reading is also the holder of a Royal Warrant from the Queen in 2007 as suppliers of household and fancy goods.

The John Lewis Christmas television advert was first launched in 2007 and it has since become an annual tradition in British culture. It is considered as a sign that the countdown to Christmas has begun.

History

Early history

The flagship store on Oxford Street began as a drapery shop, opened by John Lewis in 1864. In 1905 Lewis acquired a second store, Peter Jones in Sloane Square, London.  His eldest son, John Spedan Lewis, began the John Lewis Partnership in 1920 after thinking up the idea during his days in charge of Peter Jones. John Spedan Lewis also thought up the idea of the Gazette, the partnership's in-house magazine, first published in 1918.

In 1933, the partnership purchased its first store outside London, the long-established Jessop & Son in Nottingham. Jessops only rebranded itself as John Lewis on 27 October 2002. In 1940 the partnership bought Selfridge Provincial Stores. This group of sixteen suburban and provincial department stores included Cole Brothers, Sheffield; George Henry Lee, Liverpool; Robert Sayle, Cambridge; and Trewin Brothers, Watford; some of which continue to trade today but are now re-branded as John Lewis & Partners.

In 1937, grocery company Waitrose, consisting of ten shops and 160 employees, was taken over by John Lewis, and today operates as its supermarket arm.

In 1949, it was reported that London branches included Peter Jones, John Barnes (now a branch of Waitrose & Partners), John Pound and Bon Marche. The "provincial branches" were Robert Sayle, of Cambridge and Peterborough, Tyrrell & Green, of Southampton and Lance & Lance of Weston-super-Mare. They also had "silk shops" at Edinburgh, Hull and Newcastle upon Tyne.

In 1953, the Reading department store Heelas became part of the John Lewis group, retaining its original name until 2001 when it adopted the John Lewis name. Also in 1953, the partnership bought Herbert Parkinson, a textile manufacturer, a business which still makes duvets, pillows and furnishings for John Lewis.

1972–2000

The first John Lewis store constructed as part of a shopping centre was the relocated Jessops, in Nottingham, which has been in the Victoria Centre since it opened in 1972. The announcement of an anchor tenant such as John Lewis contributes to the certainty of developers' proposals, and so attracts other retailers to the area.

In 1992, John Lewis was once again bombed, this time by IRA members. The nearby Cavendish square was also bombed at the same time.

Before the relaxation of UK Sunday trading laws in 1994, John Lewis stores closed on Mondays to allow staff a full two-day "weekend".

The John Lewis Partnership was the first department store group in the UK to adopt central buying, launching the 'Jonell(e)' name for own-brand merchandise in 1937. That brand name has gradually been replaced with the 'John Lewis' name since 2001. Additional own brands include Collection by John Lewis as well as John Lewis & Co. and Collection Weekend by John Lewis. Several Waitrose own-brand products, such as cleaning materials and party stationery, are also available from John Lewis.

21st century
Many stores acquired by the Partnership retained their original names for many years, including Tyrrell & Green in Southampton until 2000, Bonds in Norwich until 2001, Trewins in Watford until 2001, Jessops in Nottingham (its first store outside London) until 2002, Bainbridge's in Newcastle until 2002, and Cole Brothers in Sheffield until 2002. All have now been rebranded John Lewis, with the exception of Peter Jones in south west London and Knight & Lee in Southsea (since closed, in 2019).

Investment has been made across the group in the twenty-first century. This has included the renovation of Peter Jones at a cost of £107 million, completed in 2004. The original Oxford Street shop is still the flagship and largest branch in the partnership. A complete refurbishment of the building was completed in late 2007 at a cost of £60 million. This introduced the new 'Place To Eat' restaurant and a brasserie and bistro in the store. A 'John Lewis Food Hall from Waitrose' opened in the shop's basement on 3 October 2007. A second Food Hall opened at the John Lewis Bluewater store on 6 August 2009.

The application was approved in June 2005 and the opening of the new store was scheduled for 2008. This decision was disputed and was taken to the High Court, where it was reversed.

In 2008, a controversy over the declaration of expenses by UK members of parliament revealed that Parliamentary authorities were using information from John Lewisthe "John Lewis list"as a guide to the maximum costs refundable to MPs when equipping London pieds à terre at public expense.

On 6 November 2008, it was announced that John Lewis would open their first department store outside the UK in Dublin, Ireland. Subject to planning permission, the shop will be built on O'Connell Street. The centre is being developed by Chartered Land and will be part of the largest retail centre in Ireland. As of January 2014 the €1.2 billion development is on hold and John Lewis are still seeking a location in Northern Ireland for a flagship department store.

The Cardiff store opened in September 2009 as part of the Phase 2 development of St David's Centre. The Cardiff branch is also the Partnership's only department store in Wales.
Stratford opened in 2011 together with a new Waitrose supermarket. The new shops will anchor the Westfield Stratford City development alongside the Olympic Park in east London.

In February 2011, it was announced that John Lewis was appointed as the Official Department Store provider for the London 2012 Olympic Games. As part of the deal, John Lewis stores became key retail outlets for official London 2012 merchandise.

Also in February 2011, John Lewis announced it was to open a  department store in Birmingham city centre in 2014. The completion date of 2014 was pushed back to autumn 2015 due to complications regarding the construction of the centre, including issues relating to car parks and taxi ranks. Grand Central leasing director Keith Stone said the date was pushed back to ensure a better customer experience. The store opened on 24 September 2015 and was the flagship store for the £100 million development and part of the new Grand Central shopping centre built on the south side of a redeveloped Birmingham New Street railway station.

In July 2011, John Lewis announced that it would be opening 10 new stores under a new smaller format in city centre locations over the next five years. The new smaller format department stores will hold John Lewis's core lines of Home, Electrical and Fashions, all tailored to the local area. However, the full line will still be available through online terminals within the store, as well as the "click and collect" service already available within other branches. With the first branch opening in Exeter on 12 October 2012, Andrea O'Donnell, commercial director, said the move would help John Lewis double its turnover from £3bn ($4.89bn) to £6bn over the next 10 years

In November 2011, it was announced that John Lewis had shelved plans for a new store in Preston, Lancashire as part of the Tithebarn Project. The economic climate was cited as a key factor in their decision.

It was announced that John Lewis would be the anchor tenant of a new development scheme in Leeds. The Eastgate Quarters scheme was approved in July 2011; the site, since renamed Victoria Gate, guides shoppers from central Leeds to John Lewis via a luxury arcade continuing (over Vicar Lane) from the existing Victoria Quarter. John Lewis had been looking for a site in Leeds for a while, even considering the Headingley cricket ground, and are happy they are at long last filling a major regional gap. The facade of the Leeds department store references the diagonal lines of the John Lewis motif.

In 2014, John Lewis announced its intention to anchor a £1bn extension of the Westfield London shopping centre in Shepherd's Bush, west London. The store (number 50) opened in March 2018.

In September 2015, John Lewis purchased 129–133 North Street in Brighton, a building occupied by Boots and other shops.

In November 2016, John Lewis initiated their internal resource-led ‘Project ā’ to increase profitability across several product ranges. Currently, the project efforts are focused on their Baby & Child range.

A new store in Cheltenham opened in 2018, in the former Beechwood Shopping Centre.

On 4 September 2018, John Lewis underwent a major rebrand to become John Lewis & Partners. Waitrose underwent a similar rebrand.

In October 2018, recruitment website Indeed named John Lewis & Partners as the UK's eighth best private sector employer, based on millions of employee ratings and reviews.

John Lewis started a trial in 2013 product-labelling the lifetime electricity costs on the household goods. John Lewis opened a store as the showpiece of the Bond Street retail development in the cathedral city of Chelmsford, Essex in 2016. In October 2017, the remodelled and extended Westgate Shopping Centre reopened in the medieval university city of Oxford, with a large John Lewis as the development's anchor store.

In 2018, John Lewis announced that its profits (including Waitrose) for the six months to 28 July dropped 99% from the previous year to £1.2m, and warned that full-year profits would be substantially lower. The company said that the drop was due to lower margins as "This year there has been twice as many extravaganza days as there were a year ago and actually the discounts have been even deeper.... We're never knowingly undersold at John Lewis, so of course we are matching that, and that affects margins." Not being undersold was an "extremely valuable" promise. The drop in profits was reported to be "sparking concerns it could be the next high street retailer faced with closure", following the closure of many British retail chains.

On 21 March 2020, John Lewis announced that it would temporarily close all its stores from 24 March due to the COVID-19 pandemic. It also announced a "significant" reduction of its £500 million planned investment for the year. Over 2,000 John Lewis staff were already temporarily working in Waitrose stores to cope with large grocery demands due to the coronavirus outbreak. On 9 July 2020, the company announced that they will be closing eight out of their fifty department stores, leaving 1,300 job positions at potential risk. On 24 March 2021, it announced that an additional eight stores would close. The coronavirus pandemic has had a substantial impact on John Lewis, and in 2021 the company reported losses of £517million for the previous year.

In February 2022, John Lewis announced that later in the year it would end its "never knowingly undersold" pledge to match prices on branded products from other national high street retailers. The policy began in 1925. The pledge, which does not apply to internet purchases, was said by the company's representatives to be becoming less relevant in an increasingly online market.

Stores

Department stores

As of October 2018, the John Lewis Partnership operated 52 John Lewis stores throughout Great Britain. The Oxford Street store, originally opened in 1864 (rebuilt in 1953 following significant bomb damage in World War II), is the largest operated by the partnership. 35 of the stores are traditional department stores and 12 are 'John Lewis at home' stores.

John Lewis at home
Following the early success of the Poole "at home" store, five further "at homes" opened in 2010/11 in areas outside of the catchment of the traditional John Lewis stores, including Croydon, Tunbridge Wells, Tamworth, Chester and Swindon. Further stores in Newbury and Chichester, West Sussex, opened in the spring of 2012, with Ipswich following in November 2012. On Thursday 17 June 2015, a new John Lewis at home store opened in Horsham, West Sussex along with a branch of Waitrose that relocated from the town centre.

Airport store
In the summer of 2014, John Lewis opened a small airside store in the newly rebuilt Terminal 2 at London Heathrow Airport.

It was announced on 9 July 2020 that the travel hubs, Heathrow and St Pancras, would not reopen after the first Covid-19 national lockdown.

Australia and Ireland

In spring 2016, John Lewis homeware confirmed it planned to enter the Irish market with a concession based at Arnotts Dublin store on Henry Street. It opened in October 2016 with a limited number of John Lewis branded home furnishings. However, by late 2019 the John Lewis concession was reduced in size.

By February 2017, John Lewis had opened five shop-in-shop branches in Myer department stores in Australia. The merchandise focus is on homewares. Manchester (as bedding, linens and towels are called in Australia) is manufactured to Australian bed sizes. By 2020 all concessions inside Myer stores had been closed down.

Visual identity

The graphic identity, which has at its core the distinctive diagonal motif, was created in 1990 by John Lloyd and Jim Northover of the British design consultancy Lloyd Northover. In 2000, it was given a minor refresh by London design consultancy Pentagram.

The line motif appears to be reflected in the façade of the Leeds store.

Christmas advertising

Since 2007, John Lewis has become known for producing memorable Christmas television adverts, which have gained heavy exposure on social media. Some of the more prominent campaigns are The Bear and the Hare, Monty's Christmas and Man on the Moon. The adverts, which typically rely on emotional content, have become something of an annual tradition in the UK and the music used in the campaigns has reached high positions in the UK Singles Chart.

Cancelled plans 
In September 2016, John Lewis unveiled its plans for the Brighton store which was expected to open in late 2018, but plans for the store were scrapped in May 2017.

Plans were circulating since the early 2000s for a new large store in Sheffield to replace the current store. The new store was to be included within the Sevenstone development, which has since been cancelled. A new store was to be considered for construction as part of the Sheffield Retail Quarter, scheduled to be completed by 2022.  these plans had not been confirmed and more recently, it was announced that the Sheffield John Lewis would close because of the impact of the coronavirus pandemic.

Current branches

Department stores
All stores currently trade as 'John Lewis & Partners' unless stated otherwise.
Bristol, Cribbs Causeway (opened 1998 on relocation from Bristol city centre; former Bristol location  opened 1981)
Cardiff (opened 2009)
Cambridge (opened 2007 in current location, adjacent to original site; originally Robert Sayle, acquired 1940)
Cheadle (opened 1995)
Chelmsford (opened 2016)
Cheltenham (opened 2018)
Edinburgh (opened 1973)
Exeter (opened 2012)
Glasgow (opened 1999)
Greenhithe, Bluewater (opened 1999)
High Wycombe (opened 1988; originally John Lewis Furnishing & Leisure)
Kingston upon Thames (opened 1990)
Leeds (opened 2016)
Leicester (opened 2008)
Liverpool (opened 2008 in current location; originally George Henry Lee, acquired 1940)
London, Brent Cross (opened 1976)
London, Oxford Street (opened 1864)
London, Sloane Square (trades as Peter Jones & Partners; acquired 1905)
London, Stratford (opened 2011)
London, White City (opened 2018)
Milton Keynes (opened 1979)
Newcastle upon Tyne (opened 1976 in current location; originally Bainbridge, acquired 1953)
Norwich (originally Bonds, acquired 1982)
Nottingham (opened 1972 in current location; originally Jessop & Son, acquired 1933)
Oxford (opened 2017)
Reading (originally Heelas, acquired 1953) 
Solihull (opened 2001)
Southampton (opened 2000 in current location; originally Tyrrell & Green, acquired 1934)
Trafford (opened 2005)
Welwyn Garden City (opened 1984; originally Welwyn Department Store, acquired 1983)

At Home shops
Chichester (opened 2012)
Horsham (opened 2015)
Ipswich (opened 2012)
Poole (opened 2009)

Other shops
 Swindon (outlet; opened 2007)

Former branches

Department stores

 John Barnes, Finchley Road, London – acquired 1940; closed 1981; building retained by John Lewis Partnership and now occupied by Waitrose & Partners
 Blinkhorn & Son, Gloucester – acquired 1940; closed 1953; sold to Woolworths
 Blinkhorn & Son Stroud, Stroud – acquired 1940; closed 1953
 Bon Marché, Brixton, London – acquired 1940; closed 1975
 Buckleys, Harrogate – acquired 1940; sold in 1953 to Busbys of Bradford
 A H Bull, Reading – acquired 1940; closed in 1953 with the business incorporated into Heelas; premises sold to Littlewoods
 Caleys, Windsor – acquired 1940; closed 2006
 Holdrons, Peckham, London – acquired 1940; sold 1948
 Jones Brothers, Holloway Road, London – acquired 1940; closed 1990; part of Jones Brothers site retained by John Lewis Partnership and now occupied by Waitrose & Partners
 Knight & Lee, Southsea – acquired 1934; closed 13 July 2019
 Lance & Lance, Weston-super-Mare – acquired 1933; closed 1956
 John Lewis & Co. Upton Park, Upton Park, London - a branch of John Lewis & Co. of Oxford Street trading in the early 20th Century; after disposal the store traded as The John Lewis Store of Upton Park before purchase by Chiesmans
 John Lewis & Co. Wimbledon, Wimbledon, London - a branch of John Lewis & Co. of Oxford Street trading in the early 20th Century; sold to Kennards in the 1920s
 John Lewis & Partners Aberdeen / John Lewis Aberdeen, Aberdeen - opened 1989; closed 2020
 John Lewis & Partners Birmingham / John Lewis Birmingham, Birmingham - opened 2015; closed 2020
 John Lewis & Partners Peterborough / John Lewis Peterborough, Peterborough - opened 1982; closed 2020
 John Lewis & Partners Sheffield / John Lewis Sheffield (formerly Cole Brothers), Sheffield - acquired 1940; relocated 1963; closed 2020
 John Lewis & Partners Watford / John Lewis Watford (formerly Trewins / Trewin Brothers), Watford - acquired 1940; relocated 1990; closed 2020
 John Lewis & Partners York / John Lewis York, York - opened 2014; closed 2020
 Pratts, Streatham, London – acquired 1940; closed 1990
 Quin & Axten, Brixton, London – acquired 1940; sold 1949
 Robert Sayle Peterborough (formerly Thomsons), Peterborough – acquired 1940; closed 1956
 Vinalls, Eastbourne – acquired 1947; sold 1953 to McCartney Stewart

At Home shops 
 Ashford - opened 2012; closed 2020
 Basingstoke - opened 2015; closed 2020
 Chester - opened 2011; closed 2020
 Croydon - opened 2010; closed 2020
 Newbury - opened 2012; closed 2020
 Swindon - opened 2010; closed 2020
 Tamworth - opened 2011; closed 2020
 Tunbridge Wells - opened 2011; closed 2020

Other shops
 George Henry Lee Chester, Chester - opened 1951; premises formerly occupied by John Smith & Son; closed 1967
 John Lewis & Partners Heathrow / John Lewis Heathrow, Heathrow - opened 2014; closed 2020
 John Lewis & Partners St Pancras / John Lewis St Pancras, St Pancras, London - opened 2014; closed 2020
 John Lewis Ladybird Shop, Oxford Street, London - opened 1962; closed 1977
 Daniel Neal, Portman Square, London – acquired 1963; closed 1963 with the business incorporated into John Lewis
 Daniel Neal Bournemouth, Bournemouth – acquired 1963; closed 1977
 Daniel Neal Cheltenham, Cheltenham – acquired 1963; closed 1977
 Daniel Neal Kensington, Kensington, London – acquired 1963; closed 1964 with the business incorporated into Peter Jones
 John Pound Oxford Street, Oxford Street, London - acquired 1944
 John Pound Piccadilly, Piccadilly, London - acquired 1944
 John Pound Regent Street, Regent Street, London; acquired 1944
 The Silk Shop, Newcastle upon Tyne - acquired 1943; closed 1976 to coincide with the relocation of Bainbridge
 The Silk Shop Edinburgh, Edinburgh - acquired 1943; closed 1973 to coincide with the opening of John Lewis Edinburgh
 The Silk Shop Hull, Hull - acquired 1944; sold 1953 to Ellwood Silks
 The Silk Shop Tunbridge Wells (formerly Bon Marche), Tunbridge Wells - acquired 1946; sold 1953 to John Perris
 Tyrrell & Green Winchester, Winchester - opened 1940; closed 1955

References

External links

British Royal Warrant holders
Lewis John
Lewis John
Retail companies established in 1864
Retail companies of the United Kingdom
British brands
Shops in London